Edmund Stoeckle (1899 in Augsburg - 1986 in Ottobeuren) was a German politician. He was the mayor of Augsburg, Germany, between 1933 and 1934. He was a member of the Nazi Party.

The son of Andreas Stoeckle, a prominent Catholic lay activist in Munich who was  head of the state comptroller's office ( Oberrechungshof),  with key connections  with the Reform Catholic movement,  Edmund emerged as a leading figure within student circles in Munich , furthering the  volkisch-Nazi ideas of Catholic student activists like Hansjörg Maurer, Josef Roth and Alfred Miller. He enrolled at the University of Munich in the autumn of 1919, having seen battle action on the western front 1917-1918, and on the streets of Munich as a member of the  Freikorps Epp in the spring of 1919.

References

Mayors of Augsburg
20th-century Freikorps personnel
1899 births
1986 deaths